The Apostle Islands National Lakeshore is a U.S. national lakeshore consisting of 21 islands (Apostle Islands) and shoreline encompassing  on the northern tip of Wisconsin on the shore of Lake Superior.
It is known for its collection of historic lighthouses, sandstone sea caves, a few old-growth remnant forests, and natural animal habitats. It is featured on the America the Beautiful Quarters series.

The Apostle Islands National Lakeshore is located in Bayfield, Wisconsin, on Lake Superior, the "largest, cleanest, and coldest of the Great Lakes." The lakeshore comprises beaches, cliffs, water, and 21 islands. Madeline Island, with commercial establishments of the town of La Pointe, is the only one of the Apostle Islands not included in the national lakeshore, although a portion of the island is protected as Big Bay State Park.

Ecologically, the islands contain some old growth, but primarily secondary Northern hardwood forest.  There are elements of the oak, hickory, and hemlock hardwood forests of the eastern United States, but also features of the Boreal forest typical of Ontario. Larger wildlife on the islands and surrounding area include whitetail deer, black bear, red fox, and coyote.  Smaller mammals such as squirrels, beaver, otter, snowshoe hare, and voles are also present.  Avian species in the wilderness include waterfowl, ruffed grouse, and woodcock.

Islands
Beginning in the west, going north around the outer islands, then west, then east, ending with the southernmost island, the islands are:
Eagle Island
Sand Island – dock, ranger station, camping and lighthouse
York Island – camping
Bear Island
Devils Island –  dock, lighthouse, and camping
Rocky Island – dock, ranger station, and camping
South Twin Island – dock and camping
North Twin Island
Outer Island – dock, lighthouse, and camping
Cat Island – camping
Ironwood Island – camping
Otter Island – dock and camping
Raspberry Island – dock, ranger station, and lighthouse
Oak Island – dock, ranger station, and camping
Manitou Island –  dock, ranger station, Manitou fish camp, and camping
Stockton Island – two docks, ranger station, and camping. Sites include Trout Point Logging Camp and a sandstone quarry
Gull Island
Michigan Island – dock, lighthouse, and camping
Hermit Island – includes a sandstone quarry
Basswood Island – dock, camping, and the McCloud-Brigham Farm
Long Island – modern lighthouse on the point

Historical evidence suggests that another island formerly existed alongside Eagle Island.  It was known as Steamboat Island, although this name was apparently also used for Eagle Island itself, in which case Steamboat Island was called "Little Steamboat Island."  Multiple sources dating from August 1901 document the disappearance of the island around that time, due to unknown natural forces.

History
The Apostle Islands are a result of the glaciers that once covered North America. "Geologically they are originally part of the main land at the edge of the great rift or fault which formed the depression to which the waters of Lake Superior collected." When the glaciers melted, waves from the waters of Lake Superior caused erosion that formed the islands. The islands are composed of mostly red sandstone because of the glacial shift.

It is widely assumed that Native Americans were the first to inhabit the island. "There is some evidence that they were seen and possibly visited sometime in the fourteenth century by Indians who were making their way to Isle Royale near the north shore of the land in search of copper." In the 17th century, the islands were visited by Étienne Brûlé, a French explorer who, like many French Canadians, was trying to discover a new way to the East Indies. "Historians believe that the Jesuits named the islands the Apostle Islands according to their practice of giving holy names to new places." It is said that fur traders were the first explorers to settle in the area, building a village from the money they brought in.

Previously used for logging, farming, and mining during the early 20th century, the islands are returning to a primitive state; evidence of human habitation is still present, albeit mostly obscured by the regenerating forests.  The islands' coastlines possess varied geology, where precambrian sandstone has eroded into sea caves, and the resulting sand has formed sandspits, cuspate forelands, tombolos, barrier spits, and beaches.

United States Senator Gaylord Nelson sponsored the federal legislation that established the Apostle Islands National Lakeshore. Public Law 91-424 was signed by President Richard M. Nixon on September 26, 1970. It included 20 islands, a  strip of the mainland, and approximately 1/4 mile of Lake Superior jurisdiction adjacent to each land unit.

Public Law 99-497 in 1986 added Long Island to the National Lakeshore and transferred ownership of all the light stations from the U.S. Coast Guard to the National Park Service.

After the National Park Service completed a wilderness study in 2004 and received overwhelming support from the public, Congress designated 80 percent of the land area of the national lakeshore as the Gaylord Nelson Wilderness on December 8, 2004.  (Public Law 108-447, Division E, Section 140.) Of the twenty-two Apostle Islands, the wilderness area fully or partially covers eighteen and preserves the prohibition of motorized travel on the wilderness islands. It is the largest wilderness area in Wisconsin. It is named for Gaylord Nelson, a U.S. Senator and governor of Wisconsin, who was instrumental in establishing the National Trails System, the Wilderness Act, and Earth Day.

The National Park Travelers Club held its 2012 convention at the Apostle Islands.

Recreation 
Many of the islands offer public docking; a small fee is charged for overnight use. The shoreline contains some historical sites, such as the many lighthouses throughout the islands.  Fishing on Lake Superior is a popular activity for both boaters and non-boaters. The lake holds several species of trout and some species of salmon.  In seasons when the water is warmer visitors can catch fish from the shore in water as shallow as ten feet.

Camping options range from more civilized sites that offer many amenities, such as well water, vault toilets, and food lockers, to sites that are more remote, further from other campers and offer nothing more than a tent pad or fire ring.  Camping is offered on 18 of the 21 islands in the national lakeshore.  Permits are required from the National Park Service in advance; reservations for group sites begin most years in January and for individual sites 30 days in advance.

Hunting is permitted on some islands for certain periods of the year.  Game include white-tail deer, black bear, grouse, and other small game. As white-tailed deer have become abundant in recent years, deer hunting opportunities have been plentiful, although the logistics of hunting on the islands can be difficult. Hunting black bears is limited to two islands, and there are rules and regulations that apply only to specific areas.

To get from island to island many visitors choose to kayak, either bringing their own kayaks and equipment or renting from a local shop.  The islands also offer opportunities to scuba divers to view interesting rock formations and shipwrecks. Scuba diving within a quarter-mile of any island shore requires obtaining a free permit from the park's visitor center.

Lighthouses
Apostle Islands National Lakeshore has more lighthouses than any other National Park Service area (eight historic towers on six islands). For most of the century, the six Apostle Islands Lighthouses have guided ships and boats through the rough waters of Lake Superior and through the Apostle Islands.

The Sand Island lighthouse is one of the most popular lighthouses to visit on the islands. Boats tour this island June through late August every year on trips provided by volunteers of the National Park Service. The lighthouse on Raspberry Island has been completely renovated and is one of the most scenic in the Apostle Islands. Other lighthouses in the Apostle islands include both Old and New Michigan Island Lights, New La Pointe Light and Chequamegon Point Light on Long Island, Devils Island Light, and Outer Island Light.

Local communities
Bayfield, Wisconsin, home of the national lakeshore's headquarters and visitor center, becomes more popular during the summer, when visitors travel to and from the islands.

Gallery

Notes

References
 Apostle Islands National Lake Shore. 2008. GORP. 4 Mar. 2008
 Black Phase Black Bear
 Bog on Stockton Island
 Gulls on Gull Island
 National Park Services (2006, August 23). National Park Service. Retrieved February 18, 2008
 Travel Wisconsin. 2008. Wisconsin Department of Tourism. 4 Mar. 2008
 White Manderin

External links

National Park Service: Apostle Islands National Lakeshore
Wisconsin Stewardship Network
 Gaylord Nelson Wilderness at National Park Service
 Gaylord Nelson - Wilderness.net

 
National Lakeshores of the United States
Old-growth forests
Protected areas of Ashland County, Wisconsin
Protected areas of Bayfield County, Wisconsin
National Park Service areas in Wisconsin
Protected areas established in 1970
1970 establishments in Wisconsin